The Norwegian Railway Museum is located at Hamar in  Innlandet county, Norway. It is Norway's national railway museum.

History

Established in 1896, until 1912 the collection was housed on the second floor of the Hamar Station.

The museum and has a unique collection relating to Norwegian railway history.  The collection includes several of Norway's oldest station building which have been relocated to the park. The museum also has locomotives and carriages dating back to the very earliest days of the railway in Norway. Locomotive and carriages are displayed indoors and outdoors.  They include one of Norway's largest steam locomotives - known as Dovregubben - and carriages which were part of the Norwegian Royal Train. The museum park is laid out with tracks, signals,  locomotive halls, working restaurant car which is open to the public and  Narvesen newspaper kiosk.  Two trains run on the museum grounds during the summer:   "Tertitten" (narrow gauge train) and "Knertitten" (mini train).

Exhibits in the new museum building include objects, models and illustrations relating to Norwegian railway history, as well as video displays, games, animations and railway music. Open-air exhibits are only open during the summer. The museum also has a large library and photo collection.  The photo collection has a large number of photographs from around 1860 through to today.  The photographs are ones taken by professional photographers, railway employees and private individuals. The museum is connected to the Dovre Line by a branch line.

Gallery

See also
 History of rail transport in Norway
 Norwegian Railway Club
 Rail transport in Norway

References

Other sources
Bjerke, Thor;  Holom, Finn (2004) Banedata 2004 (Oslo, Hamar: Norsk Jernbanemuseum & Norsk Jernbaneklubb)

External links
Official website

Buildings and structures in Hamar
Culture in Innlandet
Museums in Innlandet
National railway museums
Railway museums in Norway